Widdington is a village and a civil parish near Saffron Walden, in the Uttlesford district, in the county of Essex, England. The population of the parish at the 2011 census was 504. The village is located near the M11 motorway. Widdington has a church dedicated to St Mary the Virgin. Prior's Hall, now a private residence,  is  a rare survival of a stone-built structure from the late tenth or early eleventh centuries; Prior's Hall barn, from the fourteenth-century, is nearby.

Widdington was recorded in the Domesday Book of 1086 as Widituna. The entry reads: Widi(n)tuna: St Valery Abbey; Robert from Robert Gernon; Ranulf Peverel.

Location grid

See also
 The Hundred Parishes

References

External links 
 Widdington Village Website
 Vision of Britain
 British Listed Buildings on Widdington

Villages in Essex
Civil parishes in Essex
Uttlesford